Jeannie Allott (born 17 November 1956) is a former footballer who represented both England and the Netherlands at international level.

Club career
When Allott was eight years old she featured in Sports Illustrated's 'Faces in the Crowd' segment, as the only girl player in the school football team at Wistaston Green Primary School. In 1966 Allott debuted in a charity match for Fodens, originally a works team from the Edwin Foden, Sons & Co. lorry manufacturing plant in nearby Sandbach. She remained part of the Fodens team which defeated Southampton in the 1974 final of the Women's FA Cup, winning the Player of the Match award.

In 1976 Allott moved to the Netherlands and joined the Zwart-Wit '28 club. By May 1988 she was playing for KFC '71. Allott remained in the Netherlands where she worked as a shipping planner.

International career
In 1972, Allott progressed through a series of trials to be selected in Eric Worthington's first England team. She scored in the team's first official match, a 3–2 win over Scotland in Greenock on 18 November 1972. At sixteen years and one day old she remains England's youngest goal scorer. In 2022 Allott recalled hitchhiking from her native North West England to London in order to train and play with England.

After becoming established in women's football in the Netherlands, Allott was called up to the Netherlands women's national football team for their 1987 European Competition for Women's Football qualifying campaign. She scored the only goal on her debut against France and a hat-trick in the return fixture, a 5–3 win for the Dutch in Cambrai. She won 12 caps for the Netherlands, scoring a total of eight goals.

Allott felt valued in the Netherlands but remained unhappy at a lack of recognition and respect for female footballers in England: "Nothing that happened in the past should be forgotten but the FA forgot us. We want a cap and I believe we deserve an apology."

References

External links
Jeanny Allott at Royal Dutch Football Association (KNVB) 

Living people
English women's footballers
England women's international footballers
Netherlands women's international footballers
Women's association football midfielders
1956 births
Sportspeople from Crewe
English emigrants to the Netherlands
Dual internationalists (women's football)
Fodens Ladies F.C. players